Musée du Pays de Hanau is a museum in Bouxwiller in the Bas-Rhin department of France.

The Museum 
The museum was created in 1933 under the leadership of Thieling Gauthier, professor at the College of Bouxwiller. He was supported by the mayor at the time, Charles Gall. The same year, for the functioning and financing of this institution was created the Association des Amis du Musée (Friends of the Museum) which is chaired in 2010 by Danielle Buchi (Bouxwiller mayor since 1995). 

The purpose of the museum is to present to the public the history of Bouxwiller and the former county of Hanau-Lichtenberg. At the origin, the museum were located in the building of the chancery which acts as City Hall since the Revolution. From 2010 to 2013, the museum is closed to the public. It is during this long period of inventory reserves (about 2,000 pieces) and preparing the new presentation in an area of  located in the Halle aux Blés  (building of the Corn Exchange). This new museum of regional scope, benefits from the Musée de France label and hopes an attendance of 10,000 to 14,000 visitors per year. The cost of this project is € 4,514,000.

See also

List of museums in France

Local museums in France
Museums in Bas-Rhin